Raymond Englebert (21 June 1899 – 29 September 1974) was a Belgian racing cyclist. He rode in the 1924 Tour de France.

References

1899 births
1974 deaths
Belgian male cyclists
Place of birth missing